The following lists events that happened in 1965 in Iceland.

Incumbents
President – Ásgeir Ásgeirsson
Prime Minister – Bjarni Benediktsson

Events

Births

27 February – Bjarkey Gunnarsdóttir, politician.
20 March – Vigdís Hauksdóttir, politician.
17 April – Andrés Guðmundsson, strongman
14 July – Þórdís Gísladóttir, children's writer, poet, novelist and textbook writer
21 July – Guðni Bergsson, footballer
24 July – Disa Eythorsdottir, bridge player
1 November – Björk, singer-songwriter

Deaths

References

 
1960s in Iceland
Iceland
Iceland
Years of the 20th century in Iceland